Ronaldo Maczinski (born 11 September 1980), known as Ronaldo, is a Brazilian footballer who plays as a forward; he had a lengthy career in Portuguese football.

References

1980 births
Living people
Brazilian footballers
Brazilian expatriate footballers
Liga Portugal 2 players
C.S. Marítimo players
Rio Ave F.C. players
C.D. Santa Clara players
A.D. Camacha players
U.D. Oliveirense players
Expatriate footballers in Portugal
Brazilian people of Polish descent

Association football forwards